The  2002–03 FA Women's Premier League Cup was the 12th staging of the FA Women's Premier League Cup, a knockout competition for England's top 36 women's football clubs.

The tournament was won by Fulham L.F.C., who beat Arsenal L.F.C.in the final via penalty shootout.

References

Prem
Arsenal W.F.C. matches
FA Women's National League Cup
FA Women's Premier League Cup 2002-03